Rubidium acetate is a rubidium compound that is the result of dissolving rubidium metal, rubidium carbonate, or rubidium hydroxide in acetic acid. It is soluble in water like other acetates.

Uses
Rubidium acetate is used as a catalyst for the polymerization of silanol terminated siloxane oligomers.

References

Rubidium compounds
Acetates
Catalysts